Švenčionėliai  is a city in Švenčionys district municipality, Lithuania.

It is 10 km west of Švenčionys. The river Žeimena flows through Švenčionėliai.

In 1940, there were around 1000 Jews in Švenčionėliai, i.e. 20 percent of the total population. All of them were murdered  in October 1941 in the Švenčionėliai massacre.

References

Cities in Lithuania
Cities in Vilnius County
Sventsyansky Uyezd
Wilno Voivodeship (1926–1939)
Holocaust locations in Lithuania
Švenčionys District Municipality